(born 21 March, 1992) is a Japanese fashion model and an actress. She was once a model for the teen magazine Candy and later moved to model for another fashion magazine, Seventeen. She left Seventeen in 2011. She became an actress in spring 2007, appearing and starring in several TV dramas. She is now currently a model for Japanese magazine Non-no. She is half Korean on her mother's side.

Filmography

Film

TV drama

Radio
 All Night Nippon R (June 2008)
 J-Wave Tokyo Morning Radio (September 2011)

Promotional video
 Oasis (September 5, 2007)
 Yakusoku (November 14, 2007)
 Kiseki (February 13, 2008)
 Promise You (February 3, 2009)
 Tabidachi Graffiti (November 24, 2010)

References

External links
 Agency profile 
 Official Ameba blog 

1992 births
Japanese television actresses
Japanese female models
Living people
People from Nagoya
Japanese actresses of Korean descent
Japanese film actresses
21st-century Japanese actresses